An Invisible Sign is a 2010 American drama film directed by Marilyn Agrelo and starring Jessica Alba, J. K. Simmons, Chris Messina, Sophie Nyweide, and Bailee Madison. Based on the 2001 novel An Invisible Sign of My Own by Aimee Bender, the film is about a painfully withdrawn young woman who, as a child, turned to math for comfort after her father became ill, and now as an adult, teaches the subject and must help her students through their own crises.

For her performance in the film, Bailee Madison received a 2011 Young Artist Award nomination for Best Performance in a Feature Film.

Plot
Mona Gray (Jessica Alba) systematically withdraws from life into a world of mathematics after a mysterious mental illness leaves her father (John Shea) incapacitated and a shell of his former self. Forced by her mother to move out on her own, Mona gets a job as a math teacher at an elementary school. There she discovers she has an unorthodox talent for teaching and finds herself thrust back into life again, with children to care for, and a reason to live. Mona takes special interest in one of her students, Lisa Venus (Sophie Nyweide), whose mother is dying of cancer.

When fellow teacher Ben Smith (Chris Messina) shows romantic interest in her, Mona reverts to some of her old self-destructive impulses. Eventually, Mona discovers her value in the love she shows her students, and Ben's patience is finally rewarded as the two find love in each other.

Cast
 Jessica Alba as Mona Gray
 Chris Messina as Ben Smith
 John Shea as Dad
 Sônia Braga as Mom
 J. K. Simmons as Mr. Jones
 Bailee Madison as Young Mona Gray
 Sophie Nyweide as Lisa Venus
 Donovan Fowler as Levan Beeze
 Mackenzie Milone as Ann DiGanno
 Jake Richard Siciliano as Elmer Gravlaki
 Emerald-Angel Young as Rita Williams
 Ian Colletti as Danny O'Mazzi
 Marylouise Burke as Ms. Gelband
 Joanna P. Adler as Lisa's mom
 Ashlie Atkinson as Lisa's Aunt
 Crystal Bock as Panida Saleswoman
 Stephanie DeBolt as Ellen
 Sharon Washington as Levan's Mom
 Daniel McDonald as Runny Nose Boy
 Ian Blackman as Ann's Dad
 Jill Abramovitz as Ann's Mom
 Daniel Pearce as Danny's Dad
 Lori Hammel as Danny's Mom
 Conor Carroll as 5th Grader
 Brandon Jeffers as Science Kid #1
 Daniel Dugan as Attorney
 Blythe Auffarth as Candy Striper
 Marin Gazzaniga as Hostess
 Bill Coelius as Movie Patron #1
 Tom Nonnon as Doctor
 Lilly Hartley as Female Runner

Production
 Script
Aimee Bender's 2001 novel An Invisible Sign of My Own was adapted for the screen by The Wedding Planner scribes Michael Ellis and Pamela Falk.

 Filming locations
 Steiner Studios, 15 Washington Avenue, Brooklyn, New York City, New York, USA
 Tarrytown, New York, USA

 Release
A test screening was shown at Comsewogue High School in Port Jefferson Station, New York. The film premiered at the 18th Hamptons International Film Festival on October 7, 2010. It was released through video on demand on April 1, 2011, and premiered in theaters on May 6, 2011.

Reception
The film received universally negative reviews upon release. , the film holds a 0% approval rating on Rotten Tomatoes, based on fifteen reviews with an average rating of 3.05/10, including mentions to the film's "boredom" and singling out both Alba's performance and Agrelo's direction.

References

External links
 
 
 
 

2010 drama films
2010 films
American drama films
Films based on American novels
Films shot in New York City
Films set in New York City
Films directed by Marilyn Agrelo
2010s English-language films
2010s American films